Joseph Mounoundzi  is a Congolese football player who played for the People's Republic of the Congo in the 1978 African Cup of Nations.

External links

11v11 Profile

Republic of the Congo footballers
Republic of the Congo international footballers
1978 African Cup of Nations players
Living people
Association footballers not categorized by position
Year of birth missing (living people)